Gudeodiscus dautzenbergi is a species of air-breathing land snail, a terrestrial pulmonate gastropod mollusk in the family Plectopylidae.

The specific name is in honour of Belgian malacologist Philippe Dautzenberg.

Distribution
The distribution of Gudeodiscus dautzenbergi includes Vietnam.

Ecology
It is a ground-dwelling species as all other plectopylid snails in Vietnam.

Gudeodiscus phlyarius live at geographically close sites to Gudeodiscus dautzenbergi.

References

External links

Plectopylidae
Gastropods described in 1901